Erzsi Simor (Born Erzsébet Mária Terézia Porteller; 1913–1977) was a Hungarian film actress.

Selected filmography
 Segítség, örököltem! (1937)
 The Perfect Man (1939)
 The Relative of His Excellency (1941)
 Dr. Kovács István (1942)
 Two Hearts (1943)
 Édes Anna (1958)
 Meztelen diplomata (1963)
 A Pendragon legenda (1974)
 The Phantom on Horseback (1976)

External links

1913 births
1977 deaths
Hungarian film actresses
Actresses from Budapest
20th-century Hungarian actresses